Utetheisa pulchella, the crimson-speckled flunkey, crimson-speckled footman, or crimson-speckled moth, is a moth of the family Erebidae. The species was first described by Carl Linnaeus in his 1758 10th edition of Systema Naturae.

Subspecies
Subspecies include:
 Utetheisa pulchella antennata (C. Swinhoe, 1893) (Nicobars)
 Utetheisa pulchella completa Weymer, 1908
 Utetheisa pulchella dilutior Rothschild, 1910 (Angola, Congo)
 Utetheisa pulchella kallima C. Swinhoe, 1907 (Angola)
 Utetheisa pulchella pulchella (Linnaeus, 1758)

Distribution and habitat
This common widespread species can be found in most of Europe (as a migrant), in the Afrotropical realm, in North Africa, in the Near East and Central Asia, in the western Indomalayan realm (not known east of Myanmar.) In the United Kingdom it is only a sporadic migrant. These moths inhabit dry open places, meadows, shrublands, grasslands and parks.

Description

The wingspan of Utetheisa pulchella can reach 29–42 mm. The front wings are narrow, white or cream coloured with a variable pattern of numerous small black spots located between the larger-sized bright red spots. Sometimes the red spots are merged to transversal bands. The hindwings are wide, white, with an irregular black border along the outer edge and two black markings in the middle of the cell. The head and thorax range from cream colour to buff yellow, with the same pattern as the wings. The antennae are long and monofiliform. The abdomen is smooth, with a white background.

Caterpillars are warty, dark brown or greyish, with tufts of greyish hairs, an orange crossline on each segment, a wide whitish line along the back and two other lateral white lines.

Biology
This species in southern Europe overwinters as a caterpillar. Pupation occurs on the ground near the host plants, usually on fallen leaves and dead vegetation, or pieces of bark and old wood. During mild winters in temperate and typically Mediterranean climates this species hibernates as pupae. Adults of this multivoltine species usually are present from March to early November in three generations a year, but in the tropics, they develop continuously. They fly both day and night and come to light. The polyphagous larvae feed on a range of herbaceous plants, mainly on forget-me-not (Myosotis), Echium, Borago officinalis, Solanum, Plantago lanceolata and Anchusa species. In the Afrotropical realm they mainly feed on Trichodesma zeylanicum, Lithospermum, Heliotropium, Trichodesma and Gossypium species.

Due to their food, the caterpillars accumulate a large amount of alkaloids, consequently also the moths are toxic and unpalatable to birds. The characteristic colouration of its wings serve as a sign of warning to their predators (aposematism).

Gallery

Bibliography
Porter, Jim. The Colour Identification Guide to Caterpillars of the British Isles.
Philips, Roger & Carter, David. Kosmos Atlas Schmetterlingsführer, Europäische Tag und Nachtfalter. Franckh-Kosmos Verlag, Stuttgart 1991, .
Scoble, Malcolm J. (1995, London). The Lepidoptera: Form, Function and Diversity. Oxford University Press/Natural History Museum of London.
Waring, Townsend and Lewington. Field Guide to the Moths of Great Britain and Ireland

References

External links

Lepidoptera of Belgium
Wildlife Insight

pulchella
Moths described in 1758
Moths of Africa
Moths of Australia
Moths of Europe
Moths of Cape Verde
Moths of the Comoros
Moths of Madagascar
Moths of Mauritius
Moths of the Middle East
Moths of Réunion
Moths of Seychelles
Moths of Asia
Taxa named by Carl Linnaeus